A disguise is anything which conceals or changes a person's physical appearance.

Disguise  may also refer to:

 Disguise, a 2019 album by American heavy metal band Motionless in White
 Disguise (novel), a 2008 novel by Irish writer Hugo Hamilton
 Disguises (Cauterize album), 2007
 Disguises (Aiden album), 2011
 Disguises (Robots in Disguise album)
 "Disguises", a song by The Who from the 1966 EP Ready Steady Who later covered by The Jam as the B-Side of their single "Funeral Pyre"
 Disguise, Thoroughbred racehorse, foaled 1897

See also 
 Deception (disambiguation)